Montseny is a mountain range west of the coastal hills north of Barcelona. It is part of the Catalan Pre-Coastal Range.

Features
The Montseny massif is located within a triangle formed by the AP-7, C-17 and C-25 roads. It has the highest mountains in the area south of the Pyrenees and dominates the plains south of Girona. To the south lies the plateau of La Calma. In between is the Valley of the Tordera River.

The highest peaks are Turó de l'Home (1,712 m), Les Agudes (1,703 m), El Matagalls (1,697 m) and Puig Drau (1,344 m).

There are a large number of megalithic structures in the massif, such as menhirs, indicating that the area was inhabited since very ancient times.

The Santa Fe Reservoir is located in the area of the range; construction work began in 1920 and was completed in 1935.

Ecology
The Montseny is a protected area, UNESCO designated the massif a biosphere reserve in 1978. The Generalitat of Catalonia regional government designated it a natural park in 1987, the Montseny Natural Park (Parc Natural del Montseny).

The Park is home to a wide variety of fauna from Mediterranean to alpine. The critically endangered Montseny brook newt is only known from the area of this massif.

References

External links

 Tourisme-montseny.com 

Biosphere reserves of Spain
Natural parks of Catalonia
Protected areas established in 1978
Mountains of Catalonia